In complex analysis, a branch of mathematics, the Hadamard three-lines theorem is a result about the behaviour of holomorphic functions defined in regions bounded by parallel lines in the complex plane.  The theorem is named after the French mathematician Jacques Hadamard.

Statement 

Define  by

where  on the edges of the strip. The result follows once it is shown that the inequality also holds in the interior of the strip. 
After an affine transformation in the coordinate  it can be assumed that  and 
The function

Applications 
The three-line theorem can be used to prove the Hadamard three-circle theorem for a bounded continuous function  on an
annulus  holomorphic in the interior. Indeed applying the theorem to

shows that, if

then  is a convex function of 

The three-line theorem also holds for functions with values in a Banach space and plays an important role in complex interpolation theory. It can be used to prove Hölder's inequality for measurable functions

where  by considering the function

See also 

 Riesz–Thorin theorem

References 

  (the original announcement of the theorem)
 
 

Convex analysis
Theorems in complex analysis